Yasui Sokken (安井 息軒 1799–1876) was a classical scholar of Confucianism from Obi Han (now Miyazaki Prefecture). He educated many personalities including Tani Tateki, Mutsu Munemitsu and  Shinagawa Yajiro, not only in Obi but also in Edo.

Names
His child name was Junsaku and later his name was Chuhei. His Art-name was Sokken.

His birthplace

The birthplace is located in Miyazaki City, Kiyotakecho Kano Ko 3376-1, and is one of the designated Historic Sites of Miyazaki Prefecture.

Early life
He was born in 1799 in Kiyotake, Miyazaki, as the second son of Yasui Sochu, also a scholar. Yasui Sochu went to Edo in 1804 and went back to Kiyotake and opened a private school. This school was recognized by Obi han. In 1820, Sokken went to Osaka to study under Shinosaki Kosaku. In 1822, he went back to Kiyotake.

At Edo, Obi and Kiyotake
In 1824, he went up to Edo at Shoheizaka School(昌平坂学問所).  In 1826, he became a teacher of Obi Han (administrative division) han. In 1827, his father opened a school named Myokyodo at Kiyotake and he helped  his father.  In 1832, his father became the principal of Obi han school Shintokudo (振徳堂)at Obi and Sokken was the vice principal. In 1833, Sokken advised the prohibition of abortion. In 1834, Sokken became the teacher of the lord of Obi han. In 1837, he went to Edo to study again at Shoheizaka School and later became the principal of the school. In 1841, he opened his school of Sankeijuku(三計塾). In 1862, he became one of the scholars of the shogunate. In 1876 he died at Edo.

His appearance and Wife
He was very small and had smallpox scars due to smallpox caught in childhood, and therefore, was not good looking. His wife Sayo was very beautiful and helped Sokken very much. Novelist Ogai Mori wrote a book titled the wife of Yasui and praised her.

His Pupils
He taught a total of 2000 pupils, including Tani Tateki, Munemitsu Mutsu, Shinagawa Yajiro, Matsumura Kaiseki, Akashi Motojiro, Ishimoto Shinroku and many others.

His Books

読書余適:dokushoyoteki:Essay on a travel in Tohoku area
海防私議:kaiboshigi:My views on Sea Defense
書説摘要:shosekitekiyo:Various views in books
靖海問答:Harumimondo:My views on Sea Defense
Tokugawa Nariaki asked Sokken for his views on sea defense, but Sokken's views were not accepted because Nariaki died.
救急或問:Kyuukyuuarutoi:
管子纂話:Kanshisanwa:On Guanzi (text)
北潜日抄:Hokusennissho:His diary in Chinese letters
左伝輯釈:Sadenshuushaku:on Zuo Zhuan
論語集説:Rongoshusetsu:on Analects he wrote a commentary on analects which quotes from three previous sources the shuge and then shuso which is collection of previous commentary then his own comments are an but then later when this was republished as Kanbuntaikei they also added zhu xi so its a good collection of commentary. if you look at shinshaku kanbun taikei they praise this edition
弁妄:Benmou:Incoherent talk
酔余漫筆:Suiyomanpitsu:Essays written when one is drunk

References
Ichiro Kuroe, Yasui  Sokken 1982, Hyuga Bunko Kankoukai, Miyazaki*Yasui Sokken Hyakunenkisai Housankai, Yasui Sokken 1975, Miyazakigun Kiyotakecho
Kaishi Kurosaki Kyodono Ijin, Yasui Sokken, 1990, Education Committee, Kiyotakecho
Masami Wada, Gazen Sokken Shouden'' 2005, Komyakusha, Miyazaki City,

Footnotes

Miyazaki Prefecture
Japanese scholars
1799 births
1876 deaths
Japanese Confucianists